, son of regent Sukezane and adopted son of his nephew Tanemoto, was a kugyō or Japanese court noble of the Edo period (1603–1868). Michisaki was his son. He held court positions as follows:
 Kampaku (1778–1779)
 Sesshō (1779–1785)
 Daijō Daijin (1780–1781)
 Kampaku (1785–1787)

Family
Father: Kujō Sukezane
Mother: Imperial Princess Mashiko (1669-1738)
Children:
 Kujō Michisaki
 Matsudono Tadataka

References
 

1717 births
1787 deaths
Fujiwara clan
Kujō family
Shingon Buddhist monks